The Youngstown State Penguins women's basketball team represents Youngstown State University in Youngstown, Ohio, United States. The school's team currently competes in the Horizon League. The team is currently coached by John Barnes, who currently sports a record 127-112 record in eight seasons with the Penguins.

History
The Penguins have made the NCAA Tournament three times (all coinciding with their Summit League tournament titles). Of the three, they have one postseason win, in 1998. As a 12 seed, they upset Memphis 91–80. They lost to North Carolina State 88–61 in the next round. As of the end of the 2015–16 season, Youngstown State has an all-time record of 568–546.

Seasonal Results

Starting with the 2006-07 season

NCAA tournament results

References

External links